La Romaine is an unconstituted locality (as defined by Statistics Canada in the Canada 2011 Census) within the municipality of Côte-Nord-du-Golfe-du-Saint-Laurent in the Côte-Nord region of Quebec, Canada. Its population in the 2011 census was 96.

It is directly adjacent to the much larger (in population) Indian reserve of the same name.

In 2017, Mrs Danielle Collard acts as the municipal secretary.

Education
Commission scolaire du Littoral operates the Marie-Sarah School for adults. Its school program for children was suspended in 2014. It was formerly a francophone school.

References

Communities in Côte-Nord
Unconstituted localities in Quebec
Road-inaccessible communities of Quebec